Le Grand Meaulnes is a 2006 film directed by Jean-Daniel Verhaeghe, based on the classic novel of the same name. The film premiered on October 4, 2006 in France.

Plot
The film begins on a night of November 1910. Mr Seurel, who manages a quiet country school in the Sologne, provides accommodation to a boarder accompanying his mother: Augustin Meaulnes.

Meaulnes shares the bedroom of Seurel's son, with whom he strikes up a friendship.

Cast
Jean-Baptiste Maunier as François Seurel
Nicolas Duvauchelle as Augustin Meaulnes
Clémence Poésy as Yvonne de Galais
Jean-Pierre Marielle as Monsieur de Galais
Philippe Torreton as Monsieur Seurel
Émilie Dequenne as Valentine
Malik Zidi as Franz
Valérie Stroh as Millie
Florence Thomassin as Madame Meaulnes
Pascal Elso as Florentin
Roger Dumas (II) as Clockmaker
Pierre Vernier as Principal
Charles Hurez as Delouche
Clément Naslin as Delouche
Samuel Brafman as Roy
Andrée Damant

References

External links
 

2006 films
2006 drama films
Films based on French novels
2000s French-language films
Films set in the 1910s
Films scored by Philippe Sarde
French drama films
2000s French films